Pedro Rodolfo Dellacha (9 July 1926, Lanús – 31 July 2010) was an Argentine football defender and coach. He was the captain of the Argentina national team that won the 1957 Copa América and earned the nickname "Don Pedro del Area". As a manager, he won the Copa Libertadores twice and league championships in four countries.

Playing career 

Dellacha joined Quilmes Atlético Club in 1945, and in 1947 he made his debut for the first team. He was part of the squad that won the Primera B championship and promotion to the Argentine Primera in 1949. he played with the club until 1951, making a total of 141 appearances.

In 1952, Dellacha joined Racing Club where he went on to make 184 appearances and help the club to win the 1958 league championship.

In 1953, he appeared in the film "El hijo del crack".

Dellacha played 35 times for the Argentina national team between 1953 and 1958. he played in three editions of the Copa América winning the tournament twice in 1955 and 1957. In 1957 he was the captain of the team and was awarded the Olimpia de Oro for his role in leading them to victory. He also played in the 1958 FIFA World Cup.

Dellacha finished his playing career in Mexico with Club Necaxa.

Managerial career 

Dellacha went on to become a successful football manager, he won league titles in four countries (Argentina, Uruguay, Colombia and Peru) and led Independiente to two Copa Libertadores championships in 1972 and 1975.

Honours

As a player 

 Racing Club
 Argentine Primera División: 1958

 Necaxa
 Copa MX: 1959–60

 Argentina
 Copa América: 1955, 1957

As a manager 

 Independiente
 Argentine Primera División: 1971
 Copa Libertadores: 1972, 1975

 Nacional
 Uruguayan Primera División: 1977

 Millonarios
 Categoría Primera A: 1978

 Alianza Lima
Peruvian Primera División: 1992

References

External links 
 Racing Club profile 
 Olé micro profile 
  

1926 births
2010 deaths
Sportspeople from Lanús
Argentine footballers
Argentine expatriate footballers
Argentina international footballers
1958 FIFA World Cup players
Association football defenders
Quilmes Atlético Club footballers
Racing Club de Avellaneda footballers
Club Necaxa footballers
Argentine Primera División players
Liga MX players
Expatriate footballers in Mexico
Argentine football managers
Ferro Carril Oeste managers
Club Atlético Lanús managers
Club Atlético Platense managers
San Lorenzo de Almagro managers
Club Atlético Independiente managers
RC Celta de Vigo managers
Racing Club de Avellaneda managers
Club Atlético Huracán managers
Millonarios F.C. managers
Club Nacional de Football managers
C.F. Monterrey managers
Santos Laguna managers
Club Alianza Lima managers
Argentine people of Italian descent